Paolo Giordano II Orsini (1591–1656) was an Italian nobleman, Patron of arts, poet, and amateur painter.

Biography
He was the firstborn of Virginio Orsini, Duke of Bracciano and his wife Flavia Peretti, a niece of Pope Sixtus V. 
He grew in Florence, where he attended the Medici court. On the death of his father in 1615, he inherited the dukedom of Bracciano.

In Rome in 1622 he became the second husband of the widowed Isabella Appiani (ca. 1630–1635), the last survivor of the Appiani family He was also made a prince of the Holy Roman Empire by Ferdinand II on 18 July 1623.

He lived in his castle at Lake Bracciano, near Rome, where he assembled an art collection including paintings by Tintoretto, Salvator Rosa, and Daniele da Volterra, prints by Albrecht Dürer and Ottavio Leoni, sculptures by Gian Lorenzo Bernini and Johann Jakob Kornmann, among others. Paolo exchanged correspondence on the state of arts in Italy with Christina, Queen of Sweden. He died in 1656.

References

External links
 

1591 births
1656 deaths
Dukes of Bracciano
Paolo Giordano II
Princes of the Holy Roman Empire
16th-century people of the Holy Roman Empire
17th-century people of the Holy Roman Empire
16th-century Italian nobility
17th-century Italian nobility